In mathematics, a quadratic form over a field F is said to be isotropic if there is a non-zero vector on which the form evaluates to zero. Otherwise the quadratic form is anisotropic. More precisely, if q is a quadratic form on a vector space V over F, then a non-zero vector v in V is said to be isotropic if . A quadratic form is isotropic if and only if there exists a non-zero isotropic vector (or null vector) for that quadratic form. 

Suppose that  is quadratic space and W is a subspace of V. Then W is called an isotropic subspace of V if some vector in it is isotropic, a totally isotropic subspace if all vectors in it are isotropic, and an anisotropic subspace if it does not contain any (non-zero) isotropic vectors. The  of a quadratic space is the maximum of the dimensions of the totally isotropic subspaces.

A quadratic form q on a finite-dimensional real vector space V is anisotropic if and only if q is a definite form:
 either q is positive definite, i.e.  for all non-zero v in V ; 
 or q is negative definite, i.e.  for all non-zero v in V. 

More generally, if the quadratic form is non-degenerate and has the signature , then its isotropy index is the minimum of a and b. An important example of an isotropic form over the reals occurs in pseudo-Euclidean space.

Hyperbolic plane

This example is called the hyperbolic plane in the theory of quadratic forms. In particular,  is the unit hyperbola. The notation  has been used by Milnor and Husemoller for the hyperbolic plane as the signs of the terms of the bivariate polynomial r are exhibited.

The affine hyperbolic plane was described by Emil Artin as a quadratic space with basis  satisfying , where the products represent the quadratic  form.

Through the polarization identity the quadratic form is related to a symmetric bilinear form .

Two vectors u and v are orthogonal when . In the case of the hyperbolic plane, such u and v are hyperbolic-orthogonal.

Split quadratic space
A space with quadratic form is split (or metabolic) if there is a subspace which is equal to its own orthogonal complement; equivalently, the index of isotropy is equal to half the dimension. The hyperbolic plane is an example, and over a field of characteristic not equal to 2, every split space is a direct sum of hyperbolic planes.

Relation with classification of quadratic forms 

From the point of view of classification of quadratic forms, anisotropic spaces are the basic building blocks for quadratic spaces of arbitrary dimensions. For a general field F, classification of anisotropic quadratic forms is a nontrivial problem. By contrast, the isotropic forms are usually much easier to handle.  By Witt's decomposition theorem, every inner product space over a field is an orthogonal direct sum of a split space and an anisotropic space.

Field theory

See also 
 Isotropic line
 Polar space
 Witt group
 Witt ring (forms)
 Universal quadratic form

References 

 Pete L. Clark, Quadratic forms chapter I: Witts theory from University of Miami in Coral Gables, Florida.
 Tsit Yuen Lam (1973) Algebraic Theory of Quadratic Forms, §1.3 Hyperbolic plane and hyperbolic spaces, W. A. Benjamin.
 Tsit Yuen Lam (2005) Introduction to Quadratic Forms over Fields, American Mathematical Society  .
 
 

Quadratic forms
Bilinear forms